Nicolas "Nico" Van Kerckhoven (born 14 December 1970) is a Belgian retired professional footballer who played as a left-back His former clubs include Lierse and FC Schalke 04, and K.V.C. Westerlo. Van Kerckhoven was part of the Belgium national team for the 1998 and 2002 World Cups.

Honours
Lierse

 Belgian First Division: 1996–97
 Belgian Super Cup: 1997

Schalke 04
 DFP Pokal: 2000–01, 2001–02
 UEFA Intertoto Cup: 2003

Belgium
 FIFA Fair Play Trophy: 2002 World Cup

References

External links
Guardian Football

1970 births
Living people
Footballers from Antwerp Province
People from Lier, Belgium
Association football defenders
Belgian footballers
Belgian expatriate footballers
Lierse S.K. players
K.V.C. Westerlo players
FC Schalke 04 players
Borussia Mönchengladbach players
Bundesliga players
Expatriate footballers in Germany
Belgian Pro League players
Belgium international footballers
UEFA Euro 2000 players
1998 FIFA World Cup players
2002 FIFA World Cup players